Madani may refer to:

Places
Wad Madani or Madani, a city in Sudan
Azarbaijan Shahid Madani University, a state university in Iran

People
 Abbassi Madani (1931–2019), Algerian politician
 Abdul Naseer Madani, Indian Muslim leader
 Ahmad Madani (1929–2006), Iranian politician
 Hassan Madani (born 1979), Egyptian wrestler
 Hussain Ahmed Madani (1879-1957), Indian Muslim leader
 Iyad bin Amin Madani (born 1946), Saudi politician
 Mohammed Ali Madani (died 2011), Libyan military leader
 Narimène Madani (born 1984), Algerian volleyball player
 Nizar Madani (born 1941), Saudi politician
 Ruhul Amin Madani (born 1971), Bangladeshi politician
 Madani Camara (born 1987), Ivorian football player

See also
 Madan (disambiguation)
 Al Madani